The Totally Techie World of Young Dilbert: Hi-Tech Hijinks is a 1997 education game for Windows and Macintosh released by KnowWonder, based on the comic strip Dilbert.

References

External links 

 https://homepages.rpi.edu/~bulloj/search/DILBERT.html

1997 video games
Dilbert
Educational video games
Classic Mac OS games
Video games based on comics
Video games developed in the United States
Windows games
Amaze Entertainment games